Zeran v. America Online, Inc., 129 F.3d 327 (4th Cir. 1997), cert. denied, is a case in which the United States Court of Appeals for the Fourth Circuit determined the immunity of Internet service providers for wrongs committed by their users under Section 230 of the Communications Decency Act (CDA). Section 230(c)(1) of the CDA provides that "No provider or user of an interactive computer service shall be treated as the publisher or speaker of any information provided by another information content provider."

The Fourth Circuit held that plaintiff Kenneth Zeran's claims of malfeasance by America Online were barred by the CDA, holding that Section 230 "creates a federal immunity to any cause of action that would make service providers liable for information originating with a third-party user of the service." In the words of the Zeran court:

Facts 
On April 25, 1995, six days after the Oklahoma City bombing, a message was anonymously posted on the America Online (AOL) "Michigan Military Movement" bulletin board advertising items with slogans glorifying the bombing of the Alfred P. Murrah Federal Building. These items included slogans such as, "Visit Oklahoma ... It's a BLAST!!!", "Putting the kids to bed ... Oklahoma 1995", and "McVeigh for President 1996". Persons interested in making a purchase were instructed to call the plaintiff, Kenneth Zeran, whose home phone number was posted in the message but who had neither posted the message nor had anything to do with its content. Shortly after the posting of the message, Zeran began receiving a barrage of threatening calls. He contacted AOL to have the message removed, which they soon did.

After the removal of the message, however, another anonymously posted advertisement stated that the shirts had "SOLD OUT" and that items with new slogans had been made available. The new shirts included slogans such as "Forget the rescue, let the maggots take over - Oklahoma 1995", and "Finally a day care center that keeps the kids quiet - Oklahoma 1995". Zeran again contacted AOL to have the message removed from the bulletin board, which they again did. At this point, per AOL's recommendation, Zeran contacted the Federal Bureau of Investigation; however, for the next week, new messages continued to appear.

On May 1, 1995, the number of calls and threats rose to a crescendo when a conservative radio personality known as Mark Shannon read the message on an Oklahoma City radio station, KRXO, then owned by Diamond Broadcasting. At this point, Zeran's house was placed under protective surveillance, and he was unable to use his telephone for his home business, as the threatening calls were coming in approximately every two minutes. This continued until at least May 15, by which time the number of calls fell to approximately 15 per day.

On January 4, 1996, Zeran filed suit against Diamond Broadcasting, and in April of the same year, he filed a separate suit against AOL.

Lower court ruling 
At the district court for the Eastern District of Virginia  Zeran alleged that as a distributor of media content, AOL was "negligent in failing to respond adequately to the bogus notices on its bulletin board after being made aware of their malicious and fraudulent nature." In Cubby, Inc. v. CompuServe Inc., a New York district court had found that "a defendant could not be held liable for distributing defamatory statements unless it knew or had reason to know of statements." In this case, since AOL did not dispute its knowledge of the defamatory statements, Zeran claimed to have grounds for alleging AOL's participation in the defamation of his character. In response to this claim, AOL argued that the CDA, which was passed in 1996, preempted the New York ruling, which was issued in 1991 and based on that state's law at the time.

The questions at issue in the lower court ruling were determined to be:

Preemption of the state negligence claim by the CDA 
In analyzing the preemption of the state laws, the court determined that the Supremacy Clause of the U.S. Constitution demands preemption of state laws where they conflict with federal laws. The court analyzed three ways in which the state and federal laws could conflict:
 Impossibility of compliance with both state and federal law
 Conflict of language between state and federal law
 Conflict between the state law and the "purposes and objectives of Congress"

In analyzing the first theory of direct conflict, the court found that AOL could "comply with the CDA even if it is subjected to state liability for negligent distribution of defamatory material," and thus found that the federal law did not preempt the state laws.

With regard to the second and third theories of conflict however, the court found that the CDA did preempt the state laws. Based on the findings in Cubby, Inc. v. CompuServe Inc. that CompuServe "was a distributor for the purposes of defamation liability," Zeran contended that AOL was a distributor of information, not a publisher, and because §230(c)(1) of the CDA spoke specifically to publishers, Zeran alleged that there was not a conflict between the two statutes. The court found, however, that distributors are a subset of publishers, and that as a result the CDA conflicted with the state defamation law, thus preempting it.

In their analysis of the third theory of state and federal conflict, the court stated that, 

Congress' clear objective in passing §230 of the CDA was to encourage the development of technologies, procedures and techniques by which objectionable material could be blocked or deleted. 

Since distributor liability would have the effect of disincentivizing the filtering of content by third parties, the court found that such laws were in conflict with the "purpose and objectives of congress," and were thus preempted.

Retroactive application of the CDA 
Zeran's final claim was that even if the state laws are preempted by the CDA, it should not provide immunity to AOL in this case because the messages were posted on the AOL bulletin board before the CDA's enactment. In analyzing this claim, the court used the Landgraf test, which states that "a court must ... determine whether Congress has clearly expressed [a] statute's intended temporal reach."

To this question, the court pointed out that in §230(d)(3) of the CDA, Congress clearly stated that "no cause of action may be brought and no liability may be imposed under any State or local law that is inconsistent with this section." It reasons that since "no cause of action may be brought," the timing of the posting of the message is immaterial, and the CDA must apply retroactively.

Appeals court ruling 
After reviewing the proceedings of the lower court, the Fourth Circuit again granted judgment in favor of AOL. In this proceeding, Zeran again claimed a distinction between distributors and publishers, citing Cubby, Inc. v. CompuServe Inc. and Stratton Oakmont, Inc. v. Prodigy Services Co. In those cases, such a distinction was made, however the court held that Zeran "misapprehends... the significance of that distinction for the legal issue we consider here." In the opinion of the court, distributors are a subset of publishers, and are thus protected under §230 of the CDA.

The second claim Zeran made on appeal was again that the CDA should not apply retroactively. Again the court cited §230(d)(3) of the CDA, which reads that "No cause of action may be brought and no liability may be imposed under any State or local law that is inconsistent with this section." The court believed that this statute indicated that, "Congress clearly expressed its intent that the statute apply to any complaint instituted after its effective date," and that therefore any issue of retroactivity was moot.

After having lost at the district court and on appeal, Zeran, making similar allegations as above, petitioned the United States Supreme Court for a writ of certiorari. On June 22, 1998, the high court declined to hear the case.

See also

References

External links
AOL’s legal page on the case
An argument that the Fourth Circuit was wrong in its opinion in the appellate decision
Kenneth Zeran Commentary
AOL’s briefing to the Fourth Circuit
Mark Shannon’s personal website

1997 in United States case law
United States Court of Appeals for the Fourth Circuit cases
Section 230 of the Communications Decency Act
AOL
Oklahoma City bombing
United States defamation case law
Negligence case law